No Roots is the fourth album by British electronic music act Faithless, released in 2004. It reached number one on the UK Albums Chart that year, giving them their first number one album in their career. It features vocals from vocalist Dido, LSK, and the late Nina Simone.

Track listing

History
The song "No Roots" was featured on the track list of FIFA 2005 released by EA Sports.

Charts

Weekly charts

Year-end charts

Certifications

References

Faithless albums
Cheeky Records albums
2004 albums